John Henry Francis "Jack" Synon (28 July 1924 – 4 February 2015) was an Australian rules footballer who played for the Collingwood Football Club in the Victorian Football League (VFL).

Notes

External links 
	

1924 births		
2015 deaths
Australian rules footballers from Victoria (Australia)		
Collingwood Football Club players